Victor Kovalenko OAM (born 5 August 1950) is Ukrainian sailor & coach, now the head coach  of the Australian Olympic Sailing Team. Referred as "The Medal Maker," Kovalenko has coached men and women sailors to 11 medals in many Olympic Games, beginning in 1988. Seven of those medals are Gold.

Biography
Kovalenko was born in Dnipro, Ukraine, on 5 August 1950. He learned to sail at the local "Meteor Club" when he was 12 years old. He became a member of USSR National sailing team in 1973, sailing Flying Dutchmen and Dragons. In 1974 he won the national Flying Dutchman championship with Valery Maydan. That year he put racing aside to complete his education at the Nikolaev State Pedagogical Institute where he graduated with majors in Sport and Sport Science. He began sailing 470s while at Nikolaev. He considers that 16-foot Olympic class dinghy the most difficult and most satisfying boat to sail. (Victor was USSR 470 Champion in 1981 with Michael Kudrjavtsev). His nickname was Flint.

In 1978, Kovalenko met his wife, Tatiana Savenkova. A track athlete who ran the 400 meters, Miss Kovalenko was a coach before becoming an elementary school teacher. They are parents of one son, Vladimir, and have one grand daughter.

Kovalenko's competitive career ended in 1984 when USSR boycotted the 1984 Summer Olympics. After his team was disbanded, he turned part-time coaching into a full-time career.

In 2017, the book 'Medal Maker' written by Roger Vaughan on the Kovalenko's life and sailing career was published.

A film about Kovalenko based on Roger Vaughn's biographical book about him of the same name "Launch of ‘The Medal Maker’ - The story of Victor Kovalenko" is currently being shot in different parts of the world.

Coaching career
In 1983, it was announced that in 1988 women would be welcome to sail in the Olympics for the first time. The 470 was named as the first women's class. It fell to Kovelenko, a junior coach for USSR, to work with an inexperienced women's team of which little was expected. In four years, he coached former rower Larisa Moskalenko and her crew, Iryna Chunykhovska to an bronze medal at the 1988 Seoul Olympics.
	
In 1991, after the Soviet Union was dissolved, Kovalenko began coaching both men's and women's teams for Ukraine. The 1996 Atlanta Olympics were a huge success for the newly independent country's first Olympics. Ukrainians brought home nine Gold medals, two medals of them in sailing (gold and bronze). But political upheaval within the country resulted in lack of support for the sailing team. When Kovalenko was recruited by Australia, he accepted. He moved to Sydney in 1997.
	
His début as Australia's coach  at 2000 Sydney Olympics resulted in gold medals for both the men's and women's teams in the 470 class. Immediately after the Sydney Olympics, he was appointed the inaugural Head Coach of the Australian Institute of Sport Sailing Program. Australia missed the podium in Athens (2004), but  at the 2008 Beijing Olympics both Kovalenko's men's and women's 470 class teams each won gold medals.
	
At the 2012 London Olympics, the team of Mathew Belcher and Malcolm Page won gold for Australia in the 470 class. Belcher and Kovalenko have now been working together 21years.

At the 2016 Rio Olympics, the team of Mathew Belcher and Will Ryan won the silver medal in the 470 class.

His aim is to coach at the 2020 Tokyo Olympics after his wife said "Victor, you have to do Tokyo because you can’t finish your coaching career with a silver medal, you have to complete the job".

Kovalenko has coached the following 470 class crewed to Olympic gold medals:
1996 - Yevhen Braslavets / Ihor Matviyenko (Ukraine)
2000 - Tom King / Mark Turnbull  ; Jenny Armstrong / Belinda Stowell (Australia)
2008 - Nathan Wilmot / Malcolm Page ; Elise Rechichi / Tessa Parkinson (Australia)
2012 - Mathew Belcher / Malcolm Page (Australia)
2020 - Mathew Belcher / [ William Ryan]] (Australia)

Accomplishments and Honors as Coach
elewen Olympic medals (7 of them Gold) in 10 Olympic Games 
winner, 20 world championships
two ISAF Rolex Sailors of the Year (Ruslana Taran, 470, 1997; Mathew Belcher, 470, 2013)
winner, 14 European championships
winner, 118 world class regattas 
Australian Coach of the year - 2008, 2012
OAM (Medal of the Order of Australia) - 2012 
 Order of Merit ( Ukraine) 2021
Four medals from USSR and Ukrainian governments
Member, Sport Australia Hall of Fame- 2013
Inaugural member, Australian Sailing Hall of Fame - 2017
Member, 470 class Hall of Fame
Member, ISAF Coach's Commission
Vice-President, International Coaches Association
Honorary Member, Royal Queensland Yacht Squadron, Royal Tasmania Yacht Club, Sandringham Yacht Club, Cruising Yacht Club of Australia, Middle Harbor Yacht Club, Monaco Yacht Club
Ambassador, Australia Day - 2000,2013,2017,2020

References

Australian male sailors (sport)
Australian Olympic coaches
Ukrainian male sailors (sport)
Ukrainian sports coaches
Soviet male sailors (sport)
Soviet sports coaches
Sportspeople from Dnipro
1950 births
Living people
Australian Institute of Sport coaches
Sport Australia Hall of Fame inductees